Ellen M. Barry (born September 20, 1953) is an American attorney and public interest lawyer who focuses on prisoners' rights. She was a 1998 MacArthur Fellow.

Life and education
She grew up in Somerville, Massachusetts, as the second of ten children. She received a bachelor of arts degree from Swarthmore College in 1975 and a J.D. from New York University Law School in 1978. She was admitted to the State Bar of California in November 1978.

Career
In 1978 Barry founded Legal Services for Prisoners with Children (LSPC), a San Francisco-based nonprofit organization that seeks to address "young people at risk of incarceration, grandparent caregivers, alternatives to incarceration for mothers and children, and improving medical care for women in prisons and jails". where she worked as director and managing attorney until 2001, when she left to work in private practice.

She helped organize the National Network for Women in Prison, and Critical Resistance. She has represented "incarcerated women, pregnant women prisoners, prisoners, and parolees" in lawsuits.

References

External links
http://www.practicallawyer.com/radio/SS072311.mp3
https://web.archive.org/web/20110827054039/http://www.talkradioone.com/index.php/2011/07/23/next-steven-spierer-live-saturday-10am-pdt1pm-edt-12/ Steve interviews Criminal Defense attorney Ellen Barry], 7/23/11

1953 births
MacArthur Fellows
Swarthmore College alumni
New York University School of Law alumni
Living people
People from Somerville, Massachusetts
21st-century American women lawyers
21st-century American lawyers